

Player of the year

Wake Forest junior center Dickie Hemric

ACC tournament

See 1954 ACC men's basketball tournament

NCAA tournament

Round of 24

NC State  75
George Washington 73

Regional semi-finals

La Salle 88
NC State  81

Regional third place

NC State 65
Cornell 54

Tournament record

2-1

NIT

League rules prevented ACC teams from playing in NIT, 1954–1966